Mark Arnold (born May 23, 1957) is an American actor most notable for his role as a professional dancer named Gavin Wylie who became a rebel on the run on the ABC soap opera The Edge of Night from 1980 to 1983.  From 1984 to 1985, he played the role of Joe Perkins, the original hero of the daytime soap Santa Barbara, replacing Dane Witherspoon. He also appeared on the serials Guiding Light, Rituals and as Rob Coronol #2 on One Life to Live from 1987 to 1989. In 1985, Arnold played Michael J. Fox's character's nemesis, Mick McAllister, in the movie Teen Wolf. He also played a major part in the Full Moon Features films Trancers 4: Jack of Swords and Trancers 5: Sudden Deth. In 2009, he played the title character's father in the movie April Showers.

Filmography

Film

Television

References

External links
 

American male soap opera actors
Living people
1957 births
Male actors from Pennsylvania
American male film actors
People from Marple Township, Pennsylvania
20th-century American male actors
21st-century American male actors